The artificial intelligence (AI) industry in China is a rapidly developing multi-billion dollar industry. As of 2021, the artificial intelligence market is worth about RMB 150 billion (US$23.196 billion), and is projected to reach RMB 400 billion (US$61.855 billion) by 2025. The roots of China's AI development started in the late 1970s following economic reforms emphasizing science and technology as the country's primary productive force. 

The early stages of China's AI development were slow and faced serious challenges due to a lack of resources and talent. At the beginning China was behind most Western countries in terms of AI development. A majority of the research was led by scientists who had received higher education abroad.

Since 2006, China has steadily developed a national agenda for artificial intelligence development and emerged as one of the leading nations in artificial intelligence research and development. During the late 2010s, China announced in its thirteenth Five-Year Plan its aim to become a global AI leader by 2030 and to increase the worth of its AI industry to over 1 trillion RMB in the same year.

China set this goal in three stages, setting benchmarks for 2020, 2025, and 2030 respectively, as well as releasing a handful of policies, including 'Internet + AI' and 'New Generation AI Development Plan' to incentivize industry growth. Analysts estimated that China's AI development would contribute an annual growth rate of approximately 0.8% to 1.4% to China's economy.

China's central government has a list of "national AI teams" including fifteen China-based companies, including Baidu, Tencent, Alibaba, SenseTime, and iFlytek. Each company should lead the development of a designated specialized AI sector in China, such as facial recognition, software/hardware, and voice intelligence. China's rapid AI development has significantly impacted Chinese society in many areas, including the socio-economic, military, and political spheres. Agriculture, transportation, accommodation and food services, and manufacturing are the top industries that would be the most impacted by further AI deployment.

However, scholars have warned of potential negative impacts on China's labor market and disproportionate benefits between urban and rural areas, coastal and inland regions, and among different income groups. The private sector, university laboratories, and the military are working collaboratively in many aspects as there are few current existing boundaries. As China continues expanding its AI industry, there are ethical and regulatory concerns yet to be addressed, such as data control and user privacy. In 2021, China published the Data Security Law of the People's Republic of China, its first national law addressing AI-related ethical concerns. In October 2022, the United States federal government announced a series of export controls and trade restrictions intended to restrict China's access to advanced computer chips for AI applications.

History

Late 1970s to early 2000s 
Artificial intelligence research and development did not start until the late 1970s after economic reforms when Deng Xiaoping announced his famous phrase, "science and technology are primary productive forces" (科技是第一生产力). Deng's speech demonstrated China's commitment to technological innovation. While there was a lack of AI-related research between the 1950s and 1960s, some scholars believe this is due to the influence of cybernetics from the Soviet Union despite the Sino-Soviet split during the late 1950s and early 1960s. In the 1980s, a group of Chinese scientists launched AI research led by Qian Xuesen and Wu Wenjun. However, during the time, China's society still had a generally conservative view towards AI. Early AI development in China was difficult so China's government approached these challenges by sending Chinese scholars overseas to study AI and further providing government funds for research projects. The Chinese Association for Artificial Intelligence (CAAI) was founded in September 1981 and was authorized by the Ministry of Civil Affairs. Even now, CAAI is still the only national academic association in China that specializes in technology and intelligence science. The first chairman of the executive committee was Qin Yuanxun, who received a PhD in philosophy from Harvard University. In 1987, China's first research publication on artificial intelligence was published by Tsinghua University. Beginning in 1993, smart automation and intelligence have been part of China's national technology plan. Since the 2000s, China has further expanded its R&D funds for AI and the number of government-sponsored research projects has dramatically increased. In 2006, China announced a policy priority for the development of artificial intelligence, which was included in the National Medium and Long Term Plan for the Development of Science and Technology (2006–2020), released by the State Council.

Late 2010s to early 2020s 
The State Council of China issued "A Next Generation Artificial Intelligence Development Plan" (State Council Document [2017] No. 35) on 20 July 2017. In the document, the CCP Central Committee and the State Council urged governing bodies in China to promote the development of artificial intelligence. Specifically, the plan described AI as a strategic technology that has become a "focus of international competition".:2 The document urged significant investment in a number of strategic areas related to AI and called for close cooperation between the state and private sectors. On the occasion of CCP general secretary Xi Jinping's speech at the first plenary meeting of the Central Military-Civil Fusion Development Committee (CMCFDC), scholars from the National Defense University wrote in the PLA Daily that the "transferability of social resources" between economic and military ends is an essential component to being a great power.

In 2018, the State Council budgeted $2.1 billion for an AI industrial park in Mentougou district. In order to achieve this the State Council stated the need for massive talent acquisition, theoretical and practical developments, as well as public and private investments. Some researchers and scholars argued China's commitment to global AI leadership and technological competition was driven by its previous underperformance in innovation which was seen as a part of the "century of humiliation" since the Qing dynasty by the central government. There are historically embedded causes of China's anxiety towards securing an international technological dominance – China missed both industrial revolutions, the one starting in Britain in the mid-18th century, and the one that originated in America in the late-19th century. Therefore, China's government desires to take advantage of the technological revolution in today's world led by digital technology including AI to resume China's "rightful" place and to pursue the national rejuvenation proposed by Xi. Some of the stated motivations that the State Council gave for pursuing its AI strategy include the potential of artificial intelligence for industrial transformation, better social governance and maintaining social stability. The State Council predicted that China would have contributed globally to hardware, software, and methods pertinent to artificial intelligence by 2020. Specifically, the State Council projected the value of core AI industries in China to rise to 150 billion RMB, with a value of over 1 trillion RMB when accounting for related industries.

Future projection 
By 2025, the State Council aims for China to make fundamental contributions to basic AI theory and to solidify its place as a global leader in AI research. Further, the State Council aims for AI to become "the main driving force for China's industrial upgrading and economic transformation" by this time. The State Council projects the value of the core AI industry in China to be worth 400 billion RMB, with a value of over 5 trillion RMB when accounting for related industries. By 2030, the State Council aims to have China be the global leader in the development of artificial intelligence theory and technology. The State Council claims that China will have developed a "mature new-generation AI theory and technology system." At this point, the State Council projects the value of core AI industries to be worth 1 trillion RMB, with a value of over 10 trillion RMB when accounting for related industries.

List of China's Major AI-Related Policy

China's AI readiness

Government agenda 
According to a February 2019 publication by the Center for a New American Security, China's leadership – including Chinese leader Xi Jinping – believes that being at the forefront of AI technology will be critical to the future of global military and economic power competition. China is by far the United States' most ambitious competitor in the international AI market, and China's 2017 "Next Generation AI Development Plan" describes AI as a "strategic technology" that has become a "focus of international competition".:2 According to the document, China seeks to develop a core AI industry worth over 150 billion RMB132—or approximately $21.7 billion—by 2020 and will "firmly seize the strategic initiative" and reach "world-leading levels" of AI investment by 2030.:2-6

According to AI Readiness Index 2020 published by Oxford Insights, China is ranked No.19 globally with an index score of 69.08/100. The report highlighted China's score might be higher in reality since the AI index did not measure actual AI implementation itself. AIDP has divided China's AI development into three stages:

 2020 as the first benchmark: China's AI industry could match most AI-advanced nations with a value of 150 billion RMB;
 2025 as the second benchmark: become a world leader in certain AI fields with a value of 400 billion RMB;
 2030 as the third benchmark: become the world's primary AI innovation hub with a value of over 10 trillion RMB

Global Rank 
According to Statista, China's AI market reached over 128 billion RMB by 2020 and yet the market continues to grow. In today's global AI race, China shared 19% of the total global AI funding deals, which is ranked No.2 behind the U.S. (41%). According to China's 14th Five-Year Plans, the document covering China's plans for the period between 2021 and 2025 released in 2021 by the National People's Congress,  the following goals were highlighted:

 Breakthrough core AI technology barriers '突破核心技术'
 Enhance the digital economy and integrate industrial AI implementation to reach a smart economy ecosystem and a full digital transformation '打造数字经济优势，融合产业应用与数字化转型，逐渐形成智能经济形态'
 Have a comprehensive regulatory framework addressing potential concerns and risks brought by AI '构建与数字经济发展相适应的政策法规体系'

Industry Readiness 
Industry-wise, China's large population generates a massive amount of accessible data for companies and researchers, which offers a crucial advantage in the race of big data. For instance, facial recognition is one of the most widely AI applications in China. Collecting these large amounts of data from its residents helps further train and expand AI capabilities. China's market is not only conducive and valuable for corporations to further AI R&D but also offers tremendous economic potential attracting both international and domestic firms to join the AI market. The drastic development of the information and communication technology (ICT) industry and AI chipsets in recent years are two examples of this.

China's AI Research & Development
China's AI research and development crosses different sectors and organizations including private-public collaborations, academia-private collaborations, government-led projects, and many others. Many scholars believe China has adopted a 'catch-up' approach for its AI development, which is also apparent through policy documents. For public AI R&D spending, China has outspent the U.S. government over the past few years. The Chinese public AI funding mainly focused on advanced and applied research. The government funding also supported multiple AI R&D in the private sector through venture capitals that are backed by the state. Much analytic agency research showed that, while China is massively investing in all aspects of AI development, facial recognition, biotechnology, quantum computing, medical intelligence, and autonomous vehicles are AI sectors with the most attention and funding.

According to national guidance on developing China's high-tech industrial development zones by the Ministry of Science and Technology, there are fourteen cities and one county selected as an experimental development zone. Zhejiang and Guangdong provinces have the most AI innovation in experimental areas. However, the focus of AI R&D varied depending on cities and local industrial development and ecosystem. For instance, Suzhou, a city with a longstanding strong manufacturing industry, heavily focuses on automation and AI infrastructure while Wuhan focuses more on AI implementations and the education sector.

Recent Chinese achievements in the field demonstrate China's potential to realize its goals for AI development. In 2015, China's leading AI company, Baidu, created AI software capable of surpassing human levels of language recognition, almost a year in advance of Microsoft, the nearest U.S. competitor. In 2016 and 2017, Chinese teams won the top prize at the Large Scale Visual Recognition Challenge, an international competition for computer vision systems. Many of these systems are now being integrated into China's domestic surveillance network and Social Credit System, which aims to monitor, and based on social behavior, "grade" every Chinese citizen by 2021.

In China, the majority of peer-reviewed AI publications are associated with academia, which made up approximately 95.4% of the total number in 2019 which is similar to the European Union. Interdisciplinary collaborations play an essential role in China's AI R&D, including academic-corporate collaboration, public-private collaborations, and international collaborations and projects with corporate-government partnerships are the most common. The government incentivizes firms' technological innovation through policies, funding, and national endorsements. As the history section mentioned showed, China's central government released a series of policy frameworks and guidance with the embedded goal of being the global AI leader. As for AI publications, China is ranked Top three worldwide following the United States and the European Union for the total number of peer-reviewed AI publications that are produced under a corporate-academic partnership between 2015 and 2019. Besides, according to an AI index report, China surpassed the U.S. in 2020 in the total number of global AI-related journal citations. In terms of AI-related R&D, China-based peer-reviewed AI paper is mainly sponsored by the government.

Industrial Impacts

Economic Impact 
According to McKinsey's 2017 report, China's economic growth would have approximately 0.8% - 1.4% annual growth rate from AI-led automation and increases in domestic productivity benefiting food services, agriculture, manufacturing, and accommodation industries. Other sources report slightly varied figures, such as Accenture whom estimated that AI would add 1.6% economic growth to China by 2035. The World Economic Forum stated that, by 2017, there are two-thirds of the total AI investments worldwide rushing into China resulting in a 67% annual growth rate for China's AI industry. State-sponsored media specifically highlighted high-technology manufacturing industries as a strong driver to China's stable economic growth.

Most agencies hold optimistic views about AI's economic impact on China's long-term economic growth. In the past, traditional industries in China have struggled with the increase in labor costs due to the growing aging population in China and the low birth rate. With the deployment of AI, operational costs are expected to reduce while an increase in efficiency generates revenue growth. Some highlight the importance of a clear policy and governmental support in order to overcome adoption barriers including costs and lack of properly trained technical talents and AI awareness. However, there are concerns about China's deepening income inequality and the ever-expanding imbalanced labor market in China. Low- and medium-income workers might be the most negatively impacted by China's AI development because of rising demands for laborers with advanced skills. Furthermore, China's economic growth might be disproportionately divided as a majority of AI-related industrial development is concentrated in coastal regions rather than inland.

Military Impact 
China is researching various types of air, land, sea, and undersea autonomous vehicles. In the spring of 2017, a civilian Chinese university with ties to the military demonstrated an AI-enabled swarm of 1,000 uninhabited aerial vehicles at an airshow. A media report released afterwards showed a computer simulation of a similar swarm formation finding and destroying a missile launcher.:23 Open-source publications indicated that China is also developing a suite of AI tools for cyber operations.:27 Chinese development of military AI is largely influenced by China's observation of U.S. plans for defense innovation and fears of a widening "generational gap" in comparison to the U.S. military. Similar to U.S. military concepts, China aims to use AI for exploiting large troves of intelligence, generating a common operating picture, and accelerating battlefield decision-making.:12-14

China's management of its AI ecosystem contrasts with that of the United States.:6 In general, few boundaries exist between Chinese commercial companies, university research laboratories, the military, and the central government. As a result, the Chinese government has a direct means of guiding AI development priorities and accessing technology that was ostensibly developed for civilian purposes. To further strengthen these ties the Chinese government created a Military-Civil Fusion Development Commission which is intended to speed the transfer of AI technology from commercial companies and research institutions to the military in January 2017.:19 In addition, the Chinese government is leveraging both lower barriers to data collection and lower costs of data labeling to create the large databases on which AI systems train. According to one estimate, China is on track to possess 20% of the world's share of data by 2020, with the potential to have over 30% by 2030.:12

China's centrally directed effort is investing in the U.S. AI market, in companies working on militarily relevant AI applications, potentially granting it lawful access to U.S. technology and intellectual property. Chinese venture capital investment in U.S. AI companies between 2010 and 2017 totaled an estimated $1.3 billion.

Academia 
Although in 2004, Peking University introduced the first academic course on AI which led other Chinese universities to adopt AI as a discipline, especially since China faces challenges in recruiting and retaining AI engineers and researchers. Over half of the data scientists in the United States have been working in the field for over 10 years, while roughly the same proportion of data scientists in China have less than 5 years of experience. As of 2017, fewer than 30 Chinese Universities produce AI-focused experts and research products.:8 Although China surpassed the United States in the number of research papers produced from 2011 to 2015, the quality of its published papers, as judged by peer citations, ranked 34th globally. China especially want to address military applications and so the Beijing Institute of Technology, one of China's premier institutes for weapons research, recently established the first children's educational program in military AI in the world.

Ethical Concerns 
For the past years, there are discussions about AI safety and ethical concerns in both private and public sectors. In 2021, China's Ministry of Science and Technology published the first national ethical guideline, 'the New Generation of Artificial Intelligence Ethics Code''' on the topic of AI with specific emphasis on user protection, data privacy, and security. This document acknowledges the power of AI and quick technology adaptation by the big corporations for user engagements. The South China Morning Post reported that humans shall remain in full decision-making power and rights to opt-in/-out. Before this, the Beijing Academy of Artificial Intelligence has published the Beijing AI principles'' calling for essential needs in long-term research and planning of AI ethical principles. This document addresses the topics of "security and privacy", "safety and reliability", "transparency", "accountability", and "fairness".

Data security has been the most common topic in AI ethical discussion worldwide, and many national governments have established legislation addressing data privacy and security. The Cybersecurity Law of the People's Republic of China was enacted in 2017 aiming to address new challenges raised by AI development. This document includes sections about cybersecurity promotion, network operation security, information security, emergency responses, and legal responsibility. In 2021, China's new Data Security Law (DSL) was passed by the PRC congress, setting up a regulatory framework classifying all kinds of data collection and storage in China. This means all tech companies in China are required to classify their data into categories listed in Digital. Subscriber Line (DSL) and follow specific guidelines on how to govern and handle data transfers to other parties.

Leading Industrial Players 
Leading AI-centric companies and start-ups include Baidu, Tencent, Alibaba, SenseTime and Yitu Technology. Chinese AI companies iFlytek, SenseTime, Cloudwalk and DJI have received attention for facial recognition, sound recognition and drone technologies.

At the World Artificial Intelligence Conference 2019 hosted in Shanghai, the Ministry of Science and Technology announced the latest list of Chinese firms that were selected for China's AI "national team" with assigned specialized AI sectors. China has expanded its national AI team three times since its initial announcement in 2017. The number of firms involved has also expanded from five to fifteen:

 In 2017, Alibaba Cloud (阿里云), Baidu (百度), Tencent (腾讯), iFlytek (科大讯飞) are the initial four firms in China's national AI team
 In September 2018, SenseTime (商汤) became the fifth member of the team
 In 2019, ten more companies are added to the list, including Yitu (依图) and Xiaomi (小米)

Scholar Critics
An article published by the Center for a New American Security concluded that "Chinese government officials demonstrated remarkably keen understanding of the issues surrounding AI and international security. This includes knowledge of the U.S. AI policy discussions," and recommended that "the U.S. policymaking community to similarly prioritize cultivating expertise and understanding of AI developments in China" and "funding, focus, and a willingness among U.S. policymakers to drive large-scale necessary change." An article in the MIT Technology Review similarly concluded: "China might have unparalleled resources and enormous untapped potential, but the West has world-leading expertise and a strong research culture. Rather than worry about China's progress, it would be wise for Western nations to focus on their existing strengths, investing heavily in research and education."

Some experts believe that China's intent to be the first to develop military AI applications may result in comparatively less safe applications, as China will likely be more risk-acceptant throughout the development process. These experts stated that it would be unethical for the U.S. military to sacrifice safety standards for the sake of external time pressures, but that the United States' more conservative approach to AI development may result in more capable systems in the long run.:23

See also 
 Artificial intelligence
 Artificial intelligence arms race
 China Brain Project
 Fifth generation computer
 Regulation of artificial intelligence

References

Artificial intelligence
Economy of China